Cerithiopsis gordaensis is a species of sea snail, a gastropod in the family Cerithiopsidae. It was described by Rolán and Fernández-Garcés in 2010.

Distribution
This marine species occurs off Cuba.

References

 Rolán E. & Fernández-Garcés R. (2010) Four new Cerithiopsis from the Caribbean (Gastropoda, Cerithiopsidae). Basteria 74(4-6): 73-77. page(s): 76 

gordaensis
Gastropods described in 2010